Archidermaptera is an extinct suborder of earwigs in the order Dermaptera. It is one of two extinct suborders of earwigs, and contains two families (Protodiplatyidae and Dermapteridae) known only from Late Triassic to Early Cretaceous fossils. The suborder is classified on the basis of general similarities. The Archidermaptera share with modern earwigs tegmenized forewings, though they lack the distinctive forceps-like cerci of modern earwigs, have external ovipositors, and possess ocelli. The grouping has been suggested to be paraphyletic.

References 

Earwigs
Insect suborders
Prehistoric insect taxa